Ghana competed at the 1984 Summer Olympics in Los Angeles, United States.  The nation returned to the Olympic Games after boycotting both the 1976 and 1980 Games.

Results by event

Athletics
Men's 200 metres
James Idun
 Heat — 22.55 (→ did not advance)

Men's 400 metres
Charles Moses
 Heat — 50.39 (→ did not advance)
Fred Owusu (→ did not compete)

Men's 4 × 100 metres relay
 Philip Attipoe, Makarios Djan, Collins Mensah, Rex Brobby
 Semi-final Heat 2 — 40.20 (→ did not advance)

Men's Long Jump
 Francis Dodoo
 Qualification — did not start (→ did not advance, no ranking)

Boxing
Men's Light Flyweight (– 48 kg)
 Michael Dankwa
 First Round — Lost to Yehuda Ben Haim (ISR), 1:4

Men's Bantamweight (– 54 kg)
Amon Neequaye
 First Round — Bye
 Second Round — Lost to Ndaba Dube (ZIM), 0:5

References

Official Olympic Reports

Nations at the 1984 Summer Olympics
1984
Olympics